National Route 82 (N82) is a  minor primary route connecting the cities of Lapu-Lapu and Mandaue. It is the second shortest primary route, the first being the N61 highway in Metro Manila. The route consists of A.C. Cortes Avenue, the Mactan-Mandaue Bridge, Maximo V. Patalinjug, Jr. Avenue and the Basak–Marigondon Road. It is iconic for being the first highway to link Cebu and Mactan Island, the next two being N841 and Cebu–Cordova Link Expressway.

History 
The roads, including the bridge were constructed in the 1970s. During late 2016, route markers were placed, one of them being N82.

Route description 
N82 starts in Mandaue as A.C. Cortes Avenue from its intersection with M.C. Briones Street/Cebu North Road (N8) and Manuel L. Quezon Avenue. The route becomes the Mactan-Mandaue Bridge, also known as the Sergio Osmeña Bridge. After crossing the bridge, the route becomes the Maximo V. Patalinjug, Jr. Avenue. The route becomes the Basak–Marigondon Road after crossing the General Aviation Road. It ends in a dead end as the route converts into a non-national road after its terminus junction with the Mactan Circumferential National Road (N845).

References 

Roads in Cebu